Makiyamaia is a genus of sea snails, marine gastropod mollusks in the family Clavatulidae.

Distribution
This marine species is known as fossils from the Miocene to the Recent of Japan, the Pliocene of Okinawa. In Recent times it is found in the South China Sea, Korea and the Philippines and off South Africa.

Species
Species within the genus Makiyamaia include:
 Makiyamaia coreanica (Adams & Reeve, 1850)
 Makiyamaia cornulabrum Kuroda, 1961
 † Makiyamaia decorata Oleinik 1991  
 Makiyamaia gravis (Hinds, 1843)
 Makiyamaia mammillata Kuroda, 1961
 Makiyamaia orthopleura (Kilburn, 1983)
 Makiyamaia scalaria (Barnard, 1958)
 Makiyamaia sibogae Shuto, 1970
 Makiyamaia subdeclivis (Yokoyama, M., 1926)

References

 F. S. MacNeil. 1961. Tertiary and Quaternary Gastropoda of Okinawa: A comparison of the late Miocene, Pliocene, and Pleistocene Gastropoda of Okinawa with related faunas of East Asia together with a resume of the geological setting of the fossiliferous deposits. United States Geological Survey Professional Paper 339:1-148, p. 106 [Dated 1960, distributed 17 March 1961]. MacNeil described Makiyamaia but attributed the name to Tokubei Kuroda.

External links